Valesca Machado da Silva (born May 6, 1996) is a Brazilian mixed martial artist (MMA) who currently competes in Invicta Fighting Championships in the strawweight division, where she is a former Invicta FC Strawweight Champion.

Mixed martial arts career

Early career
Machado began her professional MMA career in 2016 and mainy fought in Brazil until 2022. She amassed a record of 9–3 prior to being signed by Invicta.

Machado faced Piera Rodríguez at Dana White's Contender Series 44 on October 19, 2021. She lost the fight via split decision.

Invicta Fighting Championships

Machado made her Invicta debut on September 28, 2022, at Invicta FC 49 against Liz Tracy. She won the fight via unanimous decision.

Machado faced Ediana Silva in the Invicta FC Flyweight Championship semi-final match at Invicta FC 50 on November 16. She won the fight via split decision. Later in the night, Machado faced Karolina Wójcik in the tournament final. She won the fight via unanimous decision.

Valesco defended the title against Danni McCormack on March 15, 2023 at Invicta FC 52. She lost the fight via unanimous decision.

Championships and accomplishments

Mixed martial arts 
 Invicta Fighting Championships
 Invicta FC Strawweight Championship (One time)
 TF Team
 TF Team Women's Strawweight Championship (One time)

Mixed martial arts record

|-
|Loss
|align=center| 12–4 (1)
|Danni McCormack
|Decision (unanimous)
|Invicta FC 52: Machado vs. McCormack
|
|align=center| 5
|align=center| 5:00
|Denver, Colorado, United States
|
|-
|Win
|align=center| 12–3 (1)
|Karolina Wójcik
|Decision (unanimous)
|rowspan=2|Invicta FC 50
|rowspan=2|
|align=center| 3
|align=center| 5:00
|rowspan=2|Denver, Colorado, United States
|
|-
|Win
|align=center| 11–3 (1)
|Ediana Silva
|Decision (split)
|align=center| 3
|align=center| 5:00 
|
|-
|Win
|align=center| 
|Liz Tracy
|Decision (unanimous)
|Invicta FC 49: Delboni vs. DeCoursey
|
|align=center| 3
|align=center| 5:00
|Hinton, Oklahoma, United States 
|
|-
|Win
|align=center| 9–3 (1)
|Janelice Moraes
|Submission (rear-naked choke)
|Arena Global 16
|
|align=center| 1
|align=center| 4:56
|Rio de Janeiro, Brazil
|
|-
|Loss
|align=center| 8–3 (1)
|Piera Rodriguez
|Decision (unanimous)
|Dana White's Contender Series 44
|
|align=center| 3
|align=center| 5:00
|Las Vegas, Nevada, United States 
|
|-
|Win
|align=center| 8–2 (1)
|Karen Thalita
|TKO (punches)
|Shooto Brazil: Solidariedade
|
|align=center| 2
|align=center| 2:12
|Rio de Janeiro, Brazil
|
|-
|Win
|align=center| 7–2 (1)
|Maria Ribeiro
|TKO (punches)
|Future FC 6
|
|align=center| 3
|align=center| 4:03
|São Paulo, Brazil
|
|-
|Win
|align=center| 6–2 (1)
|Janaina Soares
|TKO (punches)
|WOCS 54
|
|align=center| 1
|align=center| 1:00
|Rio de Janeiro, Brazil
|
|-
|Win
|align=center| 5–2 (1)
|Lohayne Lopes
|TKO (punches)
|Warriors Mix Challenger 1
|
|align=center| 2
|align=center| 2:37
|Rio de Janeiro, Brazil
|
|-
|Win
|align=center| 4–2 (1)
|Monique Adriane
|Decision (split)
|Shooto Brazil 88
|
|align=center| 3
|align=center| 5:00
|Rio de Janeiro, Brazil 
|
|-
|Win
|align=center| 3–2 (1)
|Julia Polastri
|Decision (unanimous)
|Shooto Brazil 84
|
|align=center| 3
|align=center| 5:00
|Rio de Janeiro, Brazil
|
|-
|Loss
|align=center| 2–2 (1)
|Marcela Giantomassi Aguiar
|Decision (split)
|Shooto Brazil 78
|
|align=center| 3
|align=center| 5:00
|Rio de Janeiro, Brazil
|
|-
|Loss
|align=center| 2–1 (1)
|Maria Oliveira
|Decision (split)
|Angels & Fight Contest 1
|
|align=center| 3
|align=center| 5:00
|Rio de Janeiro, Brazil
|
|-
|Win
|align=center| 2–0 (1)
|Elaine Leal
|Decision (split)
|Champions Fight 5
|
|align=center| 3
|align=center| 5:00
|Belo Horizonte, Brazil
|
|-
|Win
|align=center| 1–0 (1)
|Cleudilene Costa
|Decision (split)
|Fury Fight
|
|align=center| 3
|align=center| 5:00
|Rio de Janeiro, Brazil
|
|-
|NC
|align=center| 0–0 (1)
|Nayara Hemily
|No Contest (Machado missed weight)
|NCE 4
|
|align=center| 3
|align=center| 5:00
|Rio de Janeiro, Brazil
|

See also
List of current Invicta FC fighters
List of female mixed martial artists

References

External links
 

1996 births
Living people
Strawweight mixed martial artists
Brazilian female mixed martial artists
Afro-Brazilian sportspeople
Afro-Brazilian women